This is a list of people who have acted as official executioners.

Algeria

Alger

Monsieur d'Alger: The Executioners of the French Republic
In 1870 the Republic of France abolished all local executioners and named the executioner of Algiers, Antoine Rasseneux, Éxécuteur des Arrêts Criminels en Algérie, which became France's official description of the executioner of Algeria's occupation. From then on there would be one only executioner to carry out death sentences for all of Algeria. Since the colony's executioner was required to live in Algiers, people soon started to refer to him as "Le Monsieur d'Alger" ("The Man From Algiers"). Upon his nomination, Rasseneux was permitted to choose four among France's and Algeria's former local executioners to be his aides.

Australia

Austria

Hall in Tirol

Meran

Salzburg

Steyr

Vienna

Belgium

Brazil
After 1808, during the Portuguese-Brazilian Kingdom (1808–1822) and the Empire (1822–1889), when Brazil's States were still called "Provinces" and the currency was called "Reis", Brazil had factually abolished torture but was a busy death penalty country.
Method of execution was public hanging by an ultra-short drop of approximately 90 cm (2' 9 11/2"), with the executioner, after having activated the trap door or pushed the convict, according to the gallows's structure, climbed a ladder and launched himself rope downwards, hitting on the convict's shoulders with his weight.
Executioners generally were selected among convicts of capital crimes who had their death sentences stayed for indefinite terms or even commuted for life without parole, and who in exchange for their stays or commutations had to carry out the executions ordered by law. Executioners were, whenever possible, selected from among slaves convicted for a capital crime. And except for the province of Rio Grande do Norte, executioners had obligatorily to be of African descent.
As stayed or commuted convicts, executioners consequently lived as inmates in the prisons of the respective towns where they were based. When an execution was to be carried out elsewhere in his area, the executioner would be transported to the place of execution in chains and sleep in the local prison; after an attempt of murder against Fortunato José in 1834, prisons started separating the executioners from other inmates. 
In the province of Rio Grande do Norte, the executioner had always to be the convict scheduled to die next after an execution, so that province's last execution had to be carried out by a firing squad, after the necessary emergency change of execution protocol.
In the state of Rio de Janeiro, after Independence September 7, 1822 there were also free executioners of African descent who having to travel around, were reached by couriers with execution orders.
Executioners, also when slaves, were paid for their executions; at the example of the province of Minas Gerais, we can establish payment was between 4$000 and 12$000 (4 Mil-Reis to 12 Mil-Reis) per execution.
The last execution of a free convict in Brazil was that of José Pereira de Sousa October 30, 1861 in Santa Luzia (nowadays Luziânia), GO. The last execution at all under law in Brazil was that of the slave Francisco April 28, 1876 in Pilar, AL.
Brazil abolished capital punishment officially with the Proclamation of the Republic November 15, 1889, and by law with its first Republican Constitution of 1891 and Penal Code of September 22, 1892.

Bahía

Salvador

Feira de Santana

Ceará

Fortaleza

Crato

Sobral

Minas Gerais

Ouro Preto

São João del Rei

Paraná

Curitiba

Pernambuco

Recife

Caruaru

Rio de Janeiro

Rio de Janeiro

Rio Grande do Sul

Porto Alegre

Canada

China

Kingdom of Bohemia / Czechoslovakia (now Czech Republic)

Denmark

Egypt

France

Alsace

Bas-Rhin (67)

Andlau

Benfeld

Bernardswiller
see: Andlau

Bischwiller

Bouquenom
see: Sarre-Union

Bouxwiller

Brumath

Châtenois

Dambach-la-Ville

Diemeringen

Elsenheim
see: Ohnenheim

Epfig

Erstein
see: Epfig

Fleckenstein (Lembach)
see: Memmelshoffen

Fouchy

Geispolsheim

Goersdorf

Gougenheim

Gumbrechtshoffen
see: Gundershoffen

Gundershoffen

Haguenau

Herrlisheim

Hochfelden

Ingwiller

La Petite-Pierre

Lalaye

Lauterbourg

Maisonsgoutte

Marckolsheim

Marmoutier

Memmelshoffen

Molsheim

Mommenheim

Nordhouse

Obernai

Ohnenheim

Otterswiller
see: Saverne

Petersbach
see: La Petite-Pierre

Reichshoffen
see: Gundershoffen

Reutenbourg

Riedheim
see: Bouxwiller

Sarre-Union

Saverne

Schopperten
see: Sarre-Union

Sélestat

Strasbourg

Surbourg

Villé

Wasselonne

Westhoffen
see: Wasselonne

Weyersheim

Wissembourg

Haut-Rhin (68)

Altkirch

Biesheim

Colmar

Ensisheim

Ferrette

Landser

Masevaux

Morschwiller-le-Bas
see: Mulhouse

Mulhouse

Ribeauvillé

Rouffach

Sainte-Marie-aux-Mines
see: Ribeauvillé

Thann

Traubach (Traubach-le-Bas and Traubach-le-Haut)

Vieux-Thann
see: Thann

Zimmerbach

Aquitaine

Dordogne (24)

Périgueux

Gironde (33)

Bordeaux

Landes (40)

Dax

Lot-et-Garonne (47)

Agen

Pyrénées-Atlantiques (64)

Bayonne

Pau

Auvergne

Allier (03)

Moulins

Cantal (15)

Aurillac

Saint-Flour

Haute-Loire (43)

Le-Puy-en-Velay

Puy-de-Dôme (63)

Clermont-Ferrand (former Clermont-d'Auvergne)

Riom

Basse-Normandie

Calvados (14)

Bayeux

Caen

Falaise

Lisieux

Orbec

Pont-l'Évêque

Vire

Manche (50)

Avranches

Coutances

Saint-Lô

Orne (61)

Alençon

Bellême
Mortagne-au-Perche

Mortagne-au-Perche

Bourgogne

Côte-d'Or (21)

Beaune

Dijon

Semur-en-Auxois

Nièvre (58)

Nevers

Saône-et-Loire (71)

Autun

Châlon-sur-Saône

Mâcon

Yonne (89)

Auxerre

Sens

Bretagne

Côtes-d'Armor (22; Côtes-du-Nord before 1990)

Saint-Brieuc

Finistère (29)

Quimper

Ille-et-Vilaine (35)

Rennes

Morbihan (56)

Vannes

Centre-Val de Loire (Centre before 2015)

Cher (18)

Bourges

Vierzon

Eure-et-Loir (28)

Bonneval

Chartres

Châteaudun

Indre (36)

Châteauroux

Issoudun

Indre-et-Loire (37)

Amboise

Chinon

L'Île-Bouchard
see: Chinon

Loches

Tours

Loir-et-Cher (41)

Blois

Romorantin-Lanthenay

Vendôme

Loiret (45)

Gien

Montargis

Orléans

Champagne-Ardenne

Ardennes (08)

Sedan

Aube (10)

Troyes

Marne (51)

Châlons-en-Champagne

Chatillon-sur-Marne

Épernay

Reims

Vitry-le-François

Haute-Marne (52)

Bourmont

Chaumont

Langres

Corse
With a four-year delay in 1875 also Corsica was integrated into the area of the executioner of the republic's activity; see: Monsieur de Paris
For the different department numbers, before 1976 Corsica used to be one department only and was codenumbered with 20 by then.

Corse-du-Sud (2A)

Ajaccio

Haute-Corse (2B)

Bastia

Franche-Comté

Doubs (25)

Besançon

Blamont

Montbéliard

Jura (39)

Dole

Lons-le-Saunier

Haute-Saône (70)

Vesoul

Territoire de Belfort (90)

Belfort

Faverois

Grandvillars

Montreux

Haute-Normandie

Eure (27)

Évreux

Gisors

Pont-Audemer

Seine-Maritime (76)

Caudebec-en-Caux

Dièppe

Rouen

Île-de-France

Paris (75)

Prévoté de l'Hôtel du Roi

Prévoté de Paris

Seine-et-Marne (77)

Meaux

Melun

Provins

Yvelines (78)

Mantes

Meulan
see: Mantes

Montfort-l'Amaury

Versailles (Prévoté de l'Hôtel du Roi)

Prévôté de Versailles

Essonne (91)

Dourdan
see: Étampes

Étampes

La Ferté-Alais
see: Étampes

Hauts-de-Seine 92
No local executioner known so far

Seine-Saint-Denis (93)
No local executioner known so far

Val-de-Marne (94)
No local executioner known so far

Val-d'Oise (95)

Pontoise

Languedoc-Roussillon

Aude (11)

Carcassonne

Castelnaudary

Limoux

Narbonne

Gard (30)

Nîmes

Hérault (34)

Montpellier

Lozère (48)

Mende

Pyrénées-Orientales (66)

Perpignan

Limousin

Corrèze (19)

Brive-la-Gaillarde

Tulle

Creuse (23)

Guéret

Haute-Vienne 87

Limoges

Lorraine

Meurthe-et-Moselle (54)

Baccarat

Badonviller

Bauzemont

Bayon

Blâmont

Briey

Conflans-en-Jarnisy

Deneuvre
see: Baccarat

Domjevin
see: Bauzemont

Einville-au-Jard

Foug

Gerbéviller

Haraucourt
see: Einville-au-Jard

Harbouey
see: Blâmont

Longuyon

Longwy

Lunéville

Nancy

Nomény
see: Pont-à-Mousson

Norroy-le-Sec

Pont-à-Mousson

Réchicourt-la-Petite
see: Blâmont

Saint-Clément
see: Baccarat

Saint-Nicolas-de-Port

Sancy

Thézey-Saint-Martin
see: Delme at Moselle (57)

Thiaucourt (Thiaucourt-Regniéville)

see: Pont-à-Mousson

Toul

Ville-sur-Yron
see: Conflans-en-Jarnisy

Villers-la-Montagne

Meuse (55)

Arrancy-sur-Crusne
see: Longuyon at Meurthe-et-Moselle (54)

Avioth

Bar-le-Duc

Billy-sous-Mangiennes

Commercy

Damvillers

Étain

Fresnes-en-Woëvre

Herméville-en-Woëvre

Marville

Montmédy

Saint-Mihiel

Verdun

Moselle (57)

Ancerville

Angevillers

Ay-sur-Moselle
see: Buding

Bambiderstroff
see: Courcelles-sur-Nied

Béchy

Beux
see: Béchy

Bitche
see: Schorbach

Boulay

Buding

Budling
see: Buding

Château-Salins

Château-Voué
see: Dieuze

Courcelles-Chaussy

Courcelles-sur-Nied

Delme

Dieuze

Ébersviller
see: Hombourg-Budange

Elzange
see: Rodemack

Faulquemont

Fénétrange
see: Niederstinzel

Filstroff

Forbach

Freistroff

Gorze

Grostenquin

Hérange

Hombourg-Budange

Insming

Jallaucourt

Kédange-sur-Canner

Kirsch-lès-Sierck

Lixheim

Longeville-lès-Saint-Avold

Lorquin

Louvigny

Lutzelbourg

Metz

Montenach

Morhange

Niederstinzel

Phalsbourg

Porcelette

Prévocourt

Puttelange-aux-Lacs

Rodemack

Saint-Avold

Sarralbe

Sarrebourg

Sarreguemines

Schorbach

Sierck-les-Bains

Thionville

Tincry

Tragny

Vatimont

Vic-sur-Seille

Vosges (88)

Bruyères

Charmes

Châtel-sur-Moselle

Châtenois

Darney

Dompaire

Épinal

La Neuveville-sous-Châtenois

Mirecourt

Neufchâteau

Rambervillers

Remiremont

Saint-Dié

Saint-Nabord

Midi-Pyrénées

Ariège (09)

Foix

Aveyron (12)

Rodez

Haute-Garonne (31)

Toulouse

Gers (32)

Auch

Lectoure

Lot (46)

Cahors

Hautes-Pyrénées (65)

Tarbes

Tarn (81)

Albi

Tarn-et-Garonne (82)

Montauban

Nord-Pas-de-Calais

Nord (59)

Cambrai

Douai

Lille

Maubeuge

Valenciennes

Pas-de-Calais (62)

Arras

Boulogne

Calais

Saint-Omer

Pays de la Loire

Loire-Atlantique (44; before 1957 Loire Inférieure)

Nantes

Maine-et-Loire (49)

Angers

Saumur

Mayenne (53)

Château-Gontier

Laval

Sarthe (72)

La Flèche

Le Mans

Vendée (85)

Fontenay-le-Comte

Picardie

Aisne (02)

Laon

Soissons

Oise (60)

Beauvais

Clermont
(former Clermont-en-Beauvaisis, also called Clermont-en-France)

Compiègne

Crépy-en-Valois

Noyon

Senlis

Somme (80)

Amiens

Poitou-Charentes

Charente (16)

Angoulême

Charente-Maritime (17)

La Rochelle

Rochefort

Saintes

Deux-Sèvres (79)

Niort

Saint-Maixent-l'École

Thouars

Vienne (86)

Civray

Loudun

Poitiers

Provence-Alpes-Côte d'Azur

Alpes-de-Haute-Provence (04)

Digne

Hautes-Alpes (05)

Gap

Alpes-Maritimes (06)

Nice

Bouches-du-Rhône (13)

Aix-en-Provence

Var (83)

Draguignan

Vaucluse (84)

Carpentras

Rhône-Alpes

Ain (01)

Bourg-en-Bresse

Ardèche (07)

Privas

Drôme (26)

Valence

Isère (38)

Grenoble

Loire (42)

Feurs

Montbrison

Rhône (69)

Lyon

Savoie (73)

Chambéry

Haute-Savoie (74)

Monsieur de Paris: The Executioners of the French Republic
In 1870 the Republic of France abolished all local executioners and named the executioner of Paris, Jean-François Heidenreich, Exécuteur des Arrêts Criminels, which became France's official description of the executioner's occupation. From then on there would be only one executioner to carry out death sentences for all of France except Corsica which would follow in 1875. As the Republic's executioner was required to live in Paris, people soon started to refer to him as "Monsieur de Paris", "The Mister from Paris". At the occasion of his nomination, Heidenreich could choose four among France's former local executioners to be his aides.

Les Départements Outre-Mer

Guadeloupe (971)

Martinique (972)

Guyane (973)

La Réunion (974)

Saint-Pierre-et-Miquelon (975)

Mayotte (976)

Saint-Barthélemy (977)

Saint-Martin (978)

Les Territoires Outre-Mer

Wallis-et-Futuna (986)

Polynésie française (987)

Nouvelle-Calédonie (988)

Île de Clipperton (989)

French Guiana

Monsieur de Cayenne: The Executioners of the French Republic
Cayenne Central Prison never used its own guillotine. All death sentences of convicts and locally condemned prisoners were conducted at Saint-Laurent.

Monsieur de Saint-Laurent-du-Maroni|Saint-Laurent: The Executioners of the Bagne
All executioners of Saint-Laurent-du-Maroni were Bagne inmates themselves.

Germany

Pre-Germany Executioners

Local Executioners (1276 to between 1848 and 1871)

Ansbach

Augsburg

Babenhausen

Bamberg

Berlin

Bernau

Biberach

Bitterfeld

Borna

Bötzow, Oranienburg

Braunschweig

Bremen

Brüx

Burgau

Burglengenfeld

Celle

Cologne

Dillingen

Dinkelsbühl

Donauwörth

Dresden

Dühnen

Eger

Frankenstein

Frankfurt am Main

Freiberg/Sachsen

Füssen

Görlitz

Günzburg

Haigerloch

Halle

Hamburg

Hannover

Heidelberg

Heilbronn

Helmstedt

Hof

Holzen

Hoya

Husum

Kaufbeuren

Kempten

Kiel

Königsberg (now Kaliningrad, Russia)

Landeck, Silesia (now in Poland

Lauingen

Leipzig

Lentzen

Lindau

Markt Oberdorf

Memmingen

Munich

Nördlingen

Nürnberg

Ohlau

Öttingen

Passau

Pfaffenhausen

Regensburg

Sangershausen

Schönegg

Schongau

Schrobenhausen

Schwabmünchen

Siegburg

Sonthofen

Sponheim

Stuttgart

Thann in Bavaria

Torgau

Ulm

Waal

Wassertüdingen

Weißenhorn

Wittstock
Hans ?  1537

Wrietzen

State Executioners (from 1848 and 1871 to 1936/37)

Baden

Bavaria

Bremen

Hannover

Hesse

Prussia

Saxony

Württemberg

Unknown

Executioners from 1936/37 to 1945

Concentration Camp Executioners (from 1938 to 1945)

Buchenwald

Westerbork

Interim Executioners (from 1945 to 1949)

West Germany (1949 to 1951/53)
Except for Western Berlin where the Allied did not validate the new German constitution, West Germany had abolished capital punishment May 23, 1949. For West Berlin, the death penalty would still continue in law until January 20, 1951. Despite at least one executioner continued nominated, no death sentences or executions ordered by German courts in that period have been reported so far.

East Germany (1949 to 1987)

Occupation Executioners (from 1945 to 1992)

Germans

Americans

British

Soviet

Hungary 
Until 1868 most of executors employed by one-one bigger cities(who possessed the "pallosjog " [right for execution] e. c. Buda) or travellers(gypsied) did this as temporary job(until the 18th century). Emperor Joseph II introduced a law reform. The separate legislatures of the cities will be abolished, as will the patrimonial tribunal and the "pallos jog" of the estates.  Before that, bakó(executioner) belonged to the status of the county, the city, the larger estate, now five executioners will be enough throughout Hungary. Later he abolished even the capital punishment(except in the military cases)but in 1795 Emperor Franz I. reintroduced.

*Schüch Pál executioner of Pest

The list of state executioners 

Kornberger, Mihály executioner (1850?-1867)[He was executioner of Buda but later became a non official executioner of the whole country in criminal but not political cases] 
Kozarek, Ferenc state executioner( 1876–1894)
Bali, Mihály state executioner (1894-1925)
Gold, Károly state executioner (1925-1928)
Kozarek, Antal state executioner (1929-1932)
Id.(Senior) Bogár(Kovács), János state executioner (1932-1944)
Ifj. (Junior) Bogár, János state executioner (1944-1965?) (He executed: before 1945: some political prisoners, after 1945: Ferenc Szálasi, László Rajk, Imre Nagy and all death sentenced people between this time).
Pradlik, György the last state executioner (-1988)

India

Mullick family, Culcutta
 Shivlal Mullick (West Bengal)
 Nata Mullick (son of Shivlal Mullick) (hanged Dhananjoy Chatterjee in 2004) (West Bengal)
 Mahadeb Mullick (son of Nata Mullick) (West Bengal) (nominated, but not confirmed if he actually ever took the "job")
 Prabhat Mullick (grandson of Nata Mullik) (West Bengal)

Lakshman Ram family, Meerut
 Lakshman Ram Majeera (hanged Bhagat Singh)
 Mammu Singh (son of LakshmanRam Majeera) (Meerut, Uttar Pradesh)(last hanged Kanta Prasad Tiwari of Jabalpur(Madhya Pradesh) in year 1997)
 Kalu Ram (hanged one of the two Indira Gandhi murder convicts)
Pawan Kumar (hanged the Nirbhaya rapists in 2020) (2011 -till date ) 
(son of Mammu Singh) (Meerut)

 Babu Ahmad (West Bengal)

Others
 Arjun Bhika Jadhav (Maharashtra)
 Janardhan Pillai  (Kerala)
 Pooja Raj  (Delhi)
 "Jallad" Ahmadullah Khan (Uttar Pradesh) 1965-
 Balkrishna Rao Valekar (Madhya Pradesh) (Hanged Shivanand Tiwari, who accused murder of his wife & sons)

Ireland 
Ireland consisted of the Kingdom of Ireland between 1534 and 1800; it was part of the United Kingdom of Great Britain and Ireland 1801–1922; after that it was Northern Ireland and the Irish Free State; from 1937 the southern part was the Republic of Ireland.
William Marwood
James O'Sullivan
Albert Pierrepoint
Elizabeth Sugrue

ISIS

Israel

Japan

Libya

Benghazi

Malaysia

Netherlands

Amsterdam

Groningen

Utrecht

Zutphen

New Caledonia

Monsieur de Nouméa: The Exexcutioners of the French Republic

Monsieur de la Bagne: The Executioners of the Bagne
All executioners of New Caledonia's Bagne were inmates themselves.

New Zealand

Norway

Pakistan 
In Pakistan, executioners have obligatorily to be Christians.

Papal States

Poland

Portugal

Romania

Russia (USSR)

Saudi Arabia

Singapore

South Africa

Spain

Audiencia de Madrid

Audiencia de Barcelona

Audiencia de Burgos

Audiencia de Sevilla

Audiencia de Valladolid

Audiencia de Zaragoza

Sweden

Switzerland

Aargau

Appenzell Innerrhoden

Basel

Fribourg

Geneva

Glarus

Lucerne

Saint-Gall

Schwyz

Thurgau

Uri

Zug

Zurich

Federal Executioner for all Swiss Death Penalty Cantons

Thailand

United Kingdom

United States 
John C. Woods (1911–1950). Hangman for the Third Army in WWII. He was one of the hangmen who executed Nazi war criminals.

Joseph Malta (1918–1999) was the hangman who, with John C. Woods, executed the top 10 leaders of the Third Reich in Nuremberg on October 16, 1946, for crimes against humanity.

Alabama

Arkansas

During the first part of the 20th century, operators of the electric chair were known as "State electricians".

Colorado

Indiana

Louisiana

Massachusetts

Mississippi

Missouri

New York

Erie County

New York State Electrician

Ohio

Before Statehood
Sheriff John Ludlow on November 15, 1792 (today's Hamilton County)

Adams County
Sheriff John Ellison, Jr. on December 10, 1808

Cuyahoga County
Sheriff Samuel S. Baldwin and Deputy Sheriff & Coroner Levi Johnson on June 26, 1812
Sheriff Miller S. Spangler on June 1, 1855
Sheriff Felix Nicola on February 9 and 10, 1866 and August 10, 1866
Sheriff John Frazee on February 4 or 13, 1869 and April 25, 1872
Sheriff Pardon B. Smith on April 29, 1874
Sheriff A. P. Winslow on June 22, 1876
Sheriff John Wilcox on February 13, 1879

Fairfield County
Sheriff Daniel Kishler and Coroner John Heck on October 14, 1836

Franklin County
Sheriff William Domigan and Coroner A. W. Reader on February 9, 1844 (a double execution, including the first reported execution of a woman in Ohio's history)
Sheriff Silas W. Park and Coroner Elias Gaver on December 17, 1858

Gallia County
Sheriff Samuel Holcomb on September 9, 1817

Ross County
Sheriff Jeremiah McLene and Coroner Benjamin Urmston on August 3, 1804

Portage County
Sheriff Asa Burroughs on November 30, 1816

State Executioners with the Gallows
Warden Isaac Peetry between 1885 and 1886, required by state law to be the executioner of death sentences
Warden E.G. Coffin between 1886 and 1890, required by state law to be the executioner of death sentences
Warden B.F. Dyer between 1890 and 1892, required by state law to be the executioner of death sentences
Warden C.C. James between 1892 and 1896, required by state law to be the executioner of death sentences
Warden E.G. Coffin between 1896 and 1897, required by state law to be the executioner of death sentences

State Executioners with the Electric Chair
Warden E.G. Coffin between 1897 and 1900, required by state law to be the executioner of death sentences
Warden W.N. Darby between 1900 and 1903, required by state law to be the executioner of death sentences
Warden E. A. Hershey between 1903 and 1904, required by state law to be the executioner of death sentences
Warden O.B. Gould between 1904 and 1909, required by state law to be the executioner of death sentences
Warden T.H.B. Jones between 1909 and 1913, required by state law to be the executioner of death sentences
Warden D.E. Thomas between 1913 and 1935, required by state law to be the executioner of death sentences
Warden J.C. Woodard between 1935 and 1939, required by state law to be the executioner of death sentences
Warden F.D. Henderson between 1939 and 1948, required by state law to be the executioner of death sentences
Warden R.W. Alvis between 1948 and 1959, required by state law to be the executioner of death sentences
Warden B.C. Sacks between 1959 and 1961, required by state law to be the executioner of death sentences
Warden E.L. Maxwell between 1961 and 1963, required by state law to be the executioner of death sentences

Oklahoma
S.C. Treadwell and Mack Treadwell between 1909 and 1919
Rich Owens between 1918 and 1947 
Mike Mayfield, corrections officer between 1962 and 1966

Pennsylvania
 Zoe Himes in 1911 (a secretary of Clarion County, PA, Court House, she reportedly executed Vincent Voycheck on June 1, 1911)
 Frank Wilson electrical industry superintendent from Pittsburgh area who served as executioner between 1939 and 1953 at Rockview Prison.

South Carolina
Tench Boozer (1911-1918)

Texas
Joe Byrd – Captain of the guard at the Walls Unit who served as executioner between 1936 and 1964.  The nearby prison cemetery, where unclaimed remains of executed inmates are buried by the state, is named in his honor.
W. James "Jim" Estelle – Director of the Texas Department of Criminal Justice (TDCJ) between 1972 and 1983. Was designated executioner under policy developed by the TDCJ in 1976.  Was the individual pushing the drugs into the IV lines at the December 1982 execution of Charlie Brooks, the first inmate in the United States to be executed by lethal injection.

Virginia

West Virginia

Jefferson County

Zimbabwe and former Rhodesia

Sources 
Books
 Anderson, Patrick R.: "Expert witnesses: Criminologists in the Courtroom".|Albany:  State University of New York, 1987
 Armand, Frédéric: Les Bourreaux en France: Du Moyen-Âge à l'Abolition de la Peine de Mort. Paris (75): Éditions Perrin, 2012
 Delarue, Jacques: Le Métier de Bourreau: Du Moyen Âge à Aujourd'hui. Paris (75): Fayard, 1979
 Evans, Richard J.: Rituals of Retribution: Capital Punishment in Germany, 1600–1987. Oxford: Oxford University Press, 1996; London: Penguin Books, 1997
 Goulart, José Alípio: Da Palmatória ao Patíbulo: Castigos de Escravos no Brasil. Rio de Janeiro, RJ: Editora Conquista, 1971
 Koch, Tankred: Die Geschichte der Henker: Scharfrichterschicksale aus acht Jahrhunderten. Heidelberg: Kriminalistikverlag, 1988; Herrsching: Manfred-Pawlak-Verlagsgesellschaft, 1991
 Lachance, André: Le Bourreau au Canada sous le Régime Français. Québec, QC: Société historique de Québec, 1966
 Martschukat, Jürgen: Inszeniertes Töten: Eine Geschichte der Todesstrafe vom 17. bis zum 19. Jahrhundert.  Köln: Böhlau, 2000; Hamburg: 2006
 Nowosadtko, Jutta: Scharfrichter und Abdecker: Der Alltag zweier "unehrlicher Berufe" in der Frühen Neuzeit. Paderborn: 1994
 Ribeiro, João Luiz: No Meio das Galinhas as Baratas Não Têm Razão: A Lei de 10 de Junho de 1835 – Os Escravos e a Pena de Morte no Império do Brasil 1822–1889. Rio de Janeiro, RJ: Renovar, 2005.
 Rossa, Kurt: Todesstrafen: Von den Anfängen bis heute. Bergisch-Gladbach: Bastei-Lübbe-Verlag, 1979
 Streib, Victor L.: The Fairer Death: Executing Women in Ohio. Athens, OH: Ohio University Press, 2006
 Welsh-Huggins, Andrew: No Winners Here Tonight: Race, Politics, and Geography in One of the Country's Busiest Death Penalty States. Athens, OH: Ohio University Press, 2009

Magazine sources

Newspaper Sources
"1985 Contract Hoods Identity of Pennsylvania Executioner", Philadelphia Daily News, August 28, 1990

See also 
 Capital punishment
 Electric chair
 Gas chamber
 Guillotine
 Hanging
 Lethal injection

References

Sources

External links
 British Hangmen 1800 to 1964 by Richard Clark.
 The English Hangmen from 1850 to 1964 by Richard Clark.
 Geschichte der Henker I listed by Uwe Färber.
 Geschichte der Henker II listed by Uwe Färber.
 Geschichte der Henker III listed by Uwe Färber.
 Geschichte der Henker IV listed by Uwe Färber.
 Geschichte der Henker V listed by Uwe Färber.
 Histoires de Bourreaux
 Liste des Bourreaux de France by Jean-Louis Garret.

Executioners